Philipota is a genus of horse flies in the family Tabanidae.

Species
Philipota kanpurensis Kapoor, Grewal & Sharma, 1991
Philipota ludhianaensis Kapoor, Grewal & Sharma, 1991

Distribution
India

References

Tabanidae
Diptera of Asia
Brachycera genera